Rhule "Jack" Holland (c. 1909 – May 9, 1933) was an American professional boxer and college football player. He died of injuries suffered during a boxing match.

Tulane University
Holland was a prominent end for the Tulane Green Wave football teams of Tulane University, playing alongside College Football Hall of Fame inductee Jerry Dalrymple. He played in the Tulane All Star football game January 1, 1933. Following his death, his team number at Tulane (21) was retired for five years in his honor.

Football

1929
Holland was a member of the undefeated Southern Conference champion 1929 team. He was selected All-Southern.

Boxing
Holland turned to professional boxing with the intent to earn money to finish his Tulane degree, with the ultimate intent of coaching high school football. He also worked as an artist's model to pay his way through school. He once won a Southern A. A. U. light heavyweight boxing title in 1932.

Death
Holland died May 9, 1933 of a cerebral hemorrhage after losing in six rounds to Tony Marullo. As he was climbing through the ropes to go to the dressing room, ringsiders heard him say: "I butted him." Then he collapsed.

References

Year of birth missing
1933 deaths
All-Southern college football players
American football ends
American male boxers
Boxers from Louisiana
Deaths due to injuries sustained in boxing
Light-heavyweight boxers
Players of American football from Shreveport, Louisiana
Sports deaths in Louisiana
Sportspeople from Shreveport, Louisiana
Tulane Green Wave football players